Séamus Murphy (born 1986) is an Irish hurler who plays as a right corner-forward for the Carlow senior team.

Born in Bahana, County Carlow, Murphy first arrived on the inter-county scene when he first linked up with the Carlow minor team, before later joining the under-21 side. He later joined the senior team and immediately became a regular member of the starting fifteen.

At club level he is a two-time championship medallist with St Mullin's.

Honours

Player
St Mullin's
Carlow Senior Hurling Championship (5): 2010, 2014, 2015, 2016, 2019

Carlow
Christy Ring Cup (1): 2008

Individual
Awards
Carlow Hurler of the Year (2): 2010, 2016

References

1986 births
Living people
Carlow inter-county hurlers
St Mullin's hurlers